During the 2002–03 school year, the Atlantic Coast Conference (ACC) celebrated its 50th anniversary by selecting the top players in its respective sports.  Fifty players were selected for the men's basketball team, which was voted on by a 120-member committee that was chosen by the conference's 50th Anniversary Committee.

North Carolina (12) and Duke (11) led all schools with the most selections. Maryland had eight players selected, followed by Wake Forest (5), Georgia Tech and NC State (4), Virginia (3), Clemson (2) and South Carolina with one. The 50th Anniversary team includes:

 17 players who earned National Player of the Year honors a total of 22 times. Ralph Sampson is the only three-time winner in the conference's history.
 27 players who earned consensus first-team All-America honors a total of 38 times.
 18 players who were three-time first-team All-ACC selections.
 48 players were first round selections in either the annual NBA or ABA draft, including 9 players who were the first overall selection in that year's draft.
 7 players who earned Academic All-American honors.

The ACC 50th Anniversary Men's Basketball Team

In alphabetical order:

Kenny Anderson, Georgia Tech
Shane Battier, Duke
Len Bias, Maryland
Elton Brand, Duke
Tom Burleson, NC State
Len Chappell, Wake Forest
Randolph Childress, Wake Forest
Billy Cunningham, North Carolina
Brad Daugherty, North Carolina
Charlie Davis, Wake Forest
Walter Davis, North Carolina
Johnny Dawkins, Duke
Juan Dixon, Maryland
Tim Duncan, Wake Forest
Len Elmore, Maryland
Danny Ferry, Duke
Phil Ford, North Carolina
Mike Gminski, Duke
Horace Grant, Clemson
Matt Harpring, Georgia Tech
Dickie Hemric, Wake Forest
Art Heyman, Duke
Grant Hill, Duke
Bobby Hurley, Duke
Antawn Jamison, North Carolina
Bobby Jones, North Carolina
Michael Jordan, North Carolina
Albert King, Maryland
Christian Laettner, Duke
Jeff Lamp, Virginia
John Lucas, Maryland
Tom McMillen, Maryland
Larry Miller, North Carolina
Rodney Monroe, NC State
Jeff Mullins, Duke
Barry Parkhill, Virginia
Sam Perkins, North Carolina
Mark Price, Georgia Tech
John Roche, South Carolina
Wayne Rollins, Clemson
Lennie Rosenbluth, North Carolina
Ralph Sampson, Virginia
Charles Scott, North Carolina
Dennis Scott, Georgia Tech
Ron Shavlik, NC State
Joe Smith, Maryland
David Thompson, NC State
Buck Williams, Maryland
Jason Williams, Duke
James Worthy, North Carolina

References

Atlantic Coast Conference men's basketball
Lists of college men's basketball players in the United States